WOH S281 (IRAS 05261-6614) is a red supergiant located in the constellation of Dorado. It is currently among the largest known stars with a radius of over 1,300 solar radii. If placed at the center of the solar system, its photosphere would engulf the orbit of Jupiter.

See also 
 WOH G17
 WOH G64
 WOH S140 (HV 888)
 WOH S279

Notes

References 

Dorado (constellation)
M-type supergiants
IRAS catalogue objects
Extragalactic stars
Large Magellanic Cloud
TIC objects